Solomon Cordwell Buenz (SCB) is an international architecture, interior design and planning firm based in Chicago, Illinois with offices in San Francisco, California, Boston, Massachusetts, Seattle, Washington, and Abu Dhabi, United Arab Emirates.  Founded in 1931, the firm has been one of the largest contributors to Chicago's  skyline.

Projects

SCB has worked on 104 projects in the City of Chicago.  Its most recent projects include:

SCB has also designed approximately 226 buildings worldwide, including 66 office buildings, 102 urban mix use buildings, 24 retail, 27 student residences, and 7 transportation facilities in Philadelphia, San Francisco, Tucson, Serbia, Slovakia and Toronto.  Examples include:
 Murano, (Philadelphia)
 Millennium Centar, (Vršac, Serbia)
 Southfield Town Center, (Detroit)
 The Streeter, (Chicago)
 One Rincon Hill, (San Francisco)
 The St. James, (Philadelphia)
 The Fordham, (Chicago)
 Library Tower (Chicago), (Chicago)
 Elysées Condominiums, (Chicago)
 903 Peachtree (Atlanta)

References 

Architecture firms based in Chicago